Concessions of Italy in China are the territories that the Kingdom of Italy controlled in China during the 20th century. 
After participating with other colonial powers in the war against China in the second half of the 19th century, Italy obtained the Concession of Tientsin and some minor areas  in the defeated China. 

Italy in the first half of the 20th century has had concessions and fortifications in Peking, Tientsin, Shanghai, Shan Hai Kuan, Ta Ku, Amoy and Hankow. 

There was even the Treaty Port in Beihai (southern China), that was allowed to have a small area for Italian commerce.

History

During the Boxer Rebellion in 1900, the Beijing Legation Quarter became the center of an international incident during the Siege of the International Legations by the Boxers for several months.  After the siege had been broken by the Eight-Nation Alliance (that included Italy) at the end of the Battle of Peking, the foreign powers obtained the right to station troops to protect their legations under the terms of the Boxer Protocol. In addition, Italy obtained the concession in Tientsin, southeast of Beijing.

In the "International Settlement of Shanghai" was given to Italy a small area of control after WW1. Later during the fascism years the number of italian troops was increased in Shanghái, mainly when Japan invaded China in the mid 1930s.  

The main concessions (after the important colonial city-area in Tientsin) were in Shanghai and Peking. The official control of Italy in these colonial areas lasted from 1901 to 1943.

The Italian concession in Tientsin became the headquarters of the Italian Legione Redenta that fought in 1919 during the Allied intervention against Soviet troops in Siberia and Manchuria. In 1935, the Italian concession had a population of about 6,261, including 110 Italian civilians and about 536 foreigners.

All these concessions were lost by the Kingdom of Italy in the Peace Treaty of 1947, after Italy's defeat in WW2.

Consuls 

The italian concessions in China were ruled by "Consoli" (consuls), living in Tientsin:

 Cesare Poma (1901–1903)
 Giuseppe Chiostri (1904–1906)
 Oreste Da Vella (1907–1911)
 Vincenzo Fileti (1912–1919)
 Marcello Roddolo (1920–1921)
 Luigi Gabrielli di Quercita (1921–1924)
 Guido Segre (1925–1927)
 Luigi Neyrone (1928–1932)
 Filippo Zappi (1933–1938)
 Ferruccio Stefenelli (1939–1943)

Commerce

Some italian industries and commercial companies created facilities in the concession of Tientsin: the commerce between Italy and China increased in a huge way.

The Italian possessions in China enjoyed a relatively good economic development with huge Italian-chinese commerce in the 1920s and in the 1930s.

See also
 Italian concession of Tianjin

Notes

Bibliography

 Bassetti, Sandro. "Colonia italiana in Cina". Editoriale Lampi di stampa. Roma, 2014 ISBN 8848816568
 Grasselli, Enrico. "L’esercito italiano in Francia e in Oriente Corbaccio". ed. M. Milano, 1934.
 Maurizio Marinelli, Giovanni. "Italy’s Encounter with Modern China: Imperial dreams, strategic ambitions". Palgrave Macmillan. New York, 2014. ISBN 113729093

es:Concesiones italianas en China

Concessions in China
China–Italy relations